Hexadactilia is a genus of moths in the family Pterophoridae. The genus was described by Thomas Bainbrigge Fletcher in 1910.

Species
Hexadactilia borneoensis Arenberger, 1995
Hexadactilia civilis Meyrick, 1921
Hexadactilia trilobata T. B. Fletcher, 1910

Deuterocopinae
Moth genera